Jeffrey "Jeff" Vanderbeek (born 1958) is the former owner of the New Jersey Devils, a professional ice hockey team in the National Hockey League. Vanderbeek, a New Jersey native and Devils season ticket holder since the late 1980s, bought a minority stake in the Devils when Puck Holdings, an affiliate of YankeeNets, purchased the team in 2000. In 2004, he bought the team outright and resigned his position as an executive vice president of Lehman Brothers, which he joined in 1984. He was ranked the ninth highest paid executive of 2002 by Business Week with pay totaling over $29 million.

Owner of the New Jersey Devils
Vanderbeek has been a strong proponent of the Prudential Center, which hosted its first New Jersey Devils hockey game on October 27, 2007.

In 2012, Vanderbeek finalized a deal with the team's lenders that allowed him to retain the franchise for at least two years.

For the most part, Vanderbeek was a hands-off owner.  He left the Devils' day-to-day operations in the hands of president and general manager Lou Lamoriello.

In August 2013, a deal was reached where Josh Harris, owner of the NBA's Philadelphia 76ers, bought controlling interest in the Devils for over $320 million. Vanderbeek remained as a minority owner after the sale.

Personal life
Raised in Somerville, New Jersey, Vanderbeek moved to Bridgewater Township as a child and graduated from Bridgewater-Raritan High School East in 1975.

He resides in Warren Township, New Jersey, having previously resided in South Orange, New Jersey.

References

1958 births
Living people
Bridgewater-Raritan High School alumni
National Hockey League executives
National Hockey League owners
New Jersey Devils executives
People from Bridgewater Township, New Jersey
People from Somerville, New Jersey
People from South Orange, New Jersey
People from Warren Township, New Jersey